Supersystem or Super System may refer to:
supersystem, the thing, the top-level or 'container' of subsystems, the top-level of nested sub-hierarchies or sub-domains
Supersystem (band), American band 
Supersystem (album), 1998 album by The Feelers
Super/System, 1979 book by Doyle Brunson
Super System 2, 2004 book by Doyle Brunson
Super System 22,  variant of Namco System 22, arcade system board